Easa Saleh Al Gurg (died 31 March 2022) was a businessman from the United Arab Emirates and Chairman at Easa Saleh Al Gurg Group. The Group which has been in business for over six decades.

Biography
In 1960, Easa Saleh Al Gurg established the Easa Saleh al Gurg Group in Dubai. He was member of "Deliberative Committee of the Trucial States Development Office". In 1971, he took position of "Executive Director of the Trucial States Development Office". From 1991 till 2009, he was Ambassador to the UK & the Republic of Ireland.

He died on 31 March 2022.

Awards
In 1990, he was awarded CBE (Commander in the Most Excellent Order of the British Empire).

In 1997, he was awarded Order of Zayed II.

References

Year of birth missing
20th-century births
2022 deaths
Emirati businesspeople
Emirati diplomats
Ambassadors of the United Arab Emirates to the United Kingdom
Ambassadors of the United Arab Emirates to Ireland